"" (Now let us go and walk) is a Lutheran hymn for New Year's Day by Paul Gerhardt. It appeared first in 1653 in Praxis Pietatis Melica. It is sung to the melody of "".

History 
Paul Gerhardt, then a Lutheran pastor at the Nikolaikirche in Berlin, wrote the text of "" in 15 stanzas for the beginning of a new year. He wrote the lyrics to go with the melody of Ludwig Helmbold's" ". It appeared in the 1653 edition of Johann Crüger's hymnal Praxis Pietatis Melica, in the section Vom neuen Jahre (Of the new year). The content of the 10th stanza has supported the assumption that it was first published in the lost 1648 edition.

It is part of 81 hymnals internationally.

Text and theme 
Gerhardt developed his thoughts in 15 stanzas of four lines each, all of equal length, which rhyme AABB. He begins in the first stanza with a call to us to move towards the presence of God with singing and praying, recognizing him as the source of life and strength. The turn of a new year is an invitation to reflect on what is worthy to be continued. The hymn is structured in two parts of equal length and a concluding stanza. The first part looks at the past time, in the first person plural as a group or congregation, the second part contains prayers for concerns in the future, occasionally switching to a singular singer.

The text is, according to the Protestant hymnal Evangelisches Gesangbuch:

Gerhardt uses binomials frequently, such as gehn und treten (go and walk) and tun und machen (do and make). In the second stanza, the movement is interpreted as a walk in time, which is described in the following stanzas as many forms of hardship: Angst (anxiety), Schrecken (terror), Blutvergießen (shedding of blood), all caused by the experience of the Thirty Years' War which hit the Brandenburg region hard. Gerhardt contrasts them with the biblical images, of the consoling mother as in Isaiah 66:13, the protecting father as 1 John 1:18, and in the sixth stanza the experience expressed in Psalm 127:1 that human building is futile if the Lord does not support it. At the central point, the seventh stanza, Gerhardt expresses that the goodness and mercy of the Lord, new every morning, sustain us, according to Lamentations 13:22.

The wording of the second part is based on the General Intercessions (Allgemeines Kirchengebet) which traditionally included prayers for the church, all parishes around the world, the local parish and its clergy, widows and orphans, emperor and nation, peace in the world, fertility of the soil and good weather, enemies and persecutors, and in general people in need.

Legacy 
The song helped people in distress, such as Jochen Klepper who wrote in his diary at the beginning of 1942, the last year of his life, that single stanzas of the song carried weight against an expanse of horror (Weite des Grauens) that he anticipated. At the turn of the year 1944/45, Hildegard Schaeder, imprisoned at the Ravensbrück concentration camp, wrote the song down on a sheet to console herself and others; the sheet is kept in the memorial exhibition at the camp.

Melody and musical settings 
The melody goes back to Nikolaus Selnecker's tune from 1587, which Johann Crüger adapted for his hymnal. Max Reger composed a setting for three women's voices, Op. 79g.

References 
 

Lutheran hymns
New Year songs
17th-century hymns in German
Hymns by Paul Gerhardt